is a Japanese actress.

Career
Scouted in Shibuya, Kaga starred in the television drama Yonjū hassai no teikō in 1962. She became known for playing femme fatale characters in films such as Pale Flower and Getsuyōbi no Yuka. She was given the Kinuyo Tanaka Award at the Mainichi Film Awards in 2014 for her career in film.

Selected filmography

Film
Pale Flower (1964)
Getsuyōbi no Yuka (1964)
With Beauty and Sorrow (1965)
Yūgure made (1980)
Muddy River (1981)
Dotonbori River (1982)
Haru no Kane (1985)
Chōchin (1987)
Hana Yori Dango Final (2008)
Patisserie Coin de rue (2011)
In His Chart (2011)
The Lone Ume Tree (2021)

Television
Yonjū hassai no teikō (1962)
Asunaro Hakusho (1993)
Toshiie and Matsu (2002), Tatsu
From Five to Nine (2005)
Hana Yori Dango (2005)
Hana Yori Dango Returns (2007)
Gō (2011), Lady Ōba

References

External links
 

1943 births
Actresses from Tokyo
20th-century Japanese actresses
21st-century Japanese actresses
Japanese television actresses
Living people
Japanese film actresses